The Third Millennium Bridge (Spanish: Puente del Tercer Milenio) is a bow-string bridge in Zaragoza, Spain. It crosses the Ebro.

History and description 
Building works took place between 2005 and 2008. Completing the  highway, its inception was programmed vis-à-vis the Expo 2008 in Zaragoza. Commissioned by the State-funded company Zaragoza Alta Velocidad, it was built by Dragados S.A.

It was opened on 7 June 2008.

The bridge displays a length of 270 m, a width of 48 m, and a main span of 216 m.

References
Citations

Bibliography
 
 

Bridges in Aragon
Buildings and structures in Zaragoza
Tied arch bridges
Bridges completed in 2008